George Bush Supreme Court candidates may refer to:

George H. W. Bush Supreme Court candidates, the nominations made by George H. W. Bush, the 41st president of the United States
George W. Bush Supreme Court candidates, the nominations made by George W. Bush, the 43rd president of the United States